A film festival is an organized, extended presentation of films in one or more cinemas or screening venues, usually in a single city or region. Increasingly, film festivals show some films outdoors. Films may be of recent date and, depending upon the festival's focus, can include international and domestic releases. Some film festivals focus on a specific filmmaker, genre of film (e.g. horror films), or on a subject matter. Several film festivals focus solely on presenting short films of a defined maximum length. Film festivals are typically annual events. Some film historians, including Jerry Beck, do not consider film festivals as official releases of the film.

The most prestigious film festivals in the world, known as the "Big Five", are (listed chronologically according to the date of foundation): Venice, Cannes, Berlin (the original Big Three), Toronto, and Sundance.

History

The Venice Film Festival in Italy began in 1932 and is the oldest film festival still running.

Mainland Europe's biggest independent film festival is ÉCU The European Independent Film Festival, which started in 2006 and takes place every spring in Paris, France. Edinburgh International Film Festival is the longest-running festival in Great Britain as well as the longest continually running film festival in the world.

Australia's first and longest-running film festival is the Melbourne International Film Festival (1952), followed by the Sydney Film Festival (1954).

North America's first and longest-running short film festival is the Yorkton Film Festival, established in 1947. The first film festival in the United States was the Columbus International Film & Video Festival, also known as The Chris Awards, held in 1953. According to the Film Arts Foundation in San Francisco, "The Chris Awards (is) one of the most prestigious documentaries, educational, business and informational competitions in the U.S; (it is) the oldest of its kind in North America and celebrating its 54th year". It was followed four years later by the San Francisco International Film Festival, held in March 1957, which emphasized feature-length dramatic films. The festival played a major role in introducing foreign films to American audiences. Films in the first year included Akira Kurosawa's Throne of Blood and Satyajit Ray's Pather Panchali.

Today, thousands of film festivals take place around the world—from high-profile festivals such as Sundance Film Festival and Slamdance Film Festival (Park City, Utah), to horror festivals such as Terror Film Festival (Philadelphia), and the Park City Film Music Festival, the first U.S. film festival dedicated to honoring music in film.

Film Funding competitions such as Writers and Filmmakers were introduced when the cost of production could be lowered significantly and internet technology allowed for the collaboration of film production.

Film festivals have evolved significantly since the COVID-19 pandemic. Many festivals opted for virtual or hybrid festivals. The film industry, which was already in upheaval due to streaming options, has faced another major shift and movies that are showcased at festivals have an even shorter runway to online launches.

Notable film festivals 

The "Big Five" film festivals are considered to be Venice, Cannes, Berlin, Toronto and Sundance.

In North America, the Toronto International Film Festival is the most popular festival. Time wrote it had "grown from its place as the most influential fall film festival to the most influential film festival, period".

The Seattle International Film Festival is credited as being the largest film festival in the United States, regularly showing over 400 films in a month across the city.

Competitive feature films 
The festivals in Berlin, Cairo, Cannes, Goa, Karlovy Vary, Locarno, Mar del Plata, Moscow, San Sebastián, Shanghai, Tallinn, Tokyo, Venice, and Warsaw are accredited by the International Federation of Film Producers Associations (FIAPF) in the category of competitive feature films. As a rule, for films to compete, they must first be released during the festivals and not in any other previous venue beforehand.

Experimental films 
Ann Arbor Film Festival started in 1963. It is the oldest continually operated experimental film festival in North America, and has become one of the premier film festivals for independent and, primarily, experimental filmmakers to showcase work.

Independent films 
In the U.S., Telluride Film Festival, Sundance Film Festival, Austin Film Festival, Austin's South by Southwest, New York City's Tribeca Film Festival, London's London Eco-Film Festival, and Slamdance Film Festival are all considered significant festivals for independent film.  The Zero Film Festival is significant as the first and only festival exclusive to self-financed filmmakers. The biggest independent film festival in the UK is Raindance Film Festival. The British Urban Film Festival (which specifically caters to Black and minority interests) was officially recognized in the 2020 New Year Honours list.

Subject specific films 

A few film festivals have focused on highlighting specific issue topics or subjects. These festivals have included both mainstream and independent films. Some examples include military films, health-related film festivals, and human rights film festivals.

There are festivals, especially in the US, that highlight and promote films that are made by or are about various ethnic groups and nationalities or feature the cinema from a specific foreign country. These include African-Americans, Asian-Americans, Mexican-Americans, Arabs, Italian, German, French, Palestinian, and Native American.  The Deauville American Film Festival in France is devoted to the cinema of the United States.

LGBTQ+ and Women's Film Festivals are also popular.

North American film festivals 
The San Francisco International Film Festival, founded by Irving "Bud" Levin started in 1957, is the oldest continuously annual film festival in the United States. It highlights current trends in international filmmaking and video production with an emphasis on work that has not yet secured U.S. distribution.

The Vancouver International Film Festival, founded in 1958, is one of the largest film festivals in North America. It focuses on East Asian film, Canadian film, and nonfiction film. In 2016, there was an audience of 133,000 and 324 films.

The Toronto International Film Festival, founded by Bill Marshall, Henk Van der Kolk and Dusty Cohl, is regarded as North America's most important film festival, and is the most widely attended.

The Ottawa Canadian Film Festival, abbreviated OCanFilmFest, was co-founded by Ottawa-based filmmakers Jith Paul, Ed Kucerak and Blair Campbell in 2015, and features films of various durations and genres from filmmakers across Canada.

The Sundance Film Festival founded by Sterling Van Wagenen (then head of Wildwood, Robert Redford's company), John Earle, and Cirina Hampton Catania (both serving on the Utah Film Commission at the time) is a major festival for independent film.

The Woodstock Film Festival was launched in 2000 by filmmakers Meira Blaustein and Laurent Rejto to bring high-quality independent films to the Hudson Valley region of New York. Indiewire has named the Woodstock Film Festival among the top 50 independent film festivals worldwide.

The Regina International Film Festival and Awards (RIFFA) founded by John Thimothy, one of the top leading international film festivals in western Canada (Regina, Saskatchewan) represented 35 countries in 2018 festival. RIFFA annual Award show and red carpet arrival event is getting noticed in the contemporary film and fashion industries in Western Canada.

Toronto's Hot Docs founded by filmmaker Paul Jay, is a North American documentary film festival. Toronto has the largest number of film festivals in the world, ranging from cultural, independent, and historic films.

The Seattle International Film Festival, which screens 270 features and approximately 150 short films, is the largest American film festival in terms of the number of feature productions.

The Expresión en Corto International Film Festival is the largest competitive film festival in Mexico. It specializes in emerging talent, and is held in the last week of each July in the two colonial cities of San Miguel de Allende and Guanajuato.

Other Mexican festivals include the Guadalajara International Film Festival in Guadalajara, Oaxaca Film Fest, the Morelia International Film Festival in Morelia, Michoacan Mexico, and the Los Cabos International Film Festival founded by Scott Cross, Sean Cross, and Eduardo Sanchez Navarro, in Los Cabos, Baja Sur, Mexico are considered the most important film festivals in Latin America. In 2015, Variety called the Los Cabos International Film Festival the "Cannes of Latin America".

South American film festivals 

The Cartagena Film Festival, founded by Victor Nieto in 1960, is the oldest in Latin America. The Festival de Gramado (or Gramado Film Festival) Gramado, Brazil.

The Valdivia International Film Festival is held annually in the city of Valdivia. It is arguable the most important film festival in Chile. There is also Filmambiente, held in Rio de Janeiro, Brazil, an international festival on environmental films and videos.

The Caribbean 
For Spanish-speaking countries, the Dominican International Film Festival takes place annually in Puerto Plata, Dominican Republic. As well as the Havana Film Festival was founded in 1979 and is the oldest continuous annual film festival in the Caribbean. Its focus is on Latin American cinema.

The Trinidad and Tobago Film Festival, founded in 2006, is dedicated to screening the newest films from the English-, Spanish, French- and Dutch-speaking Caribbean, as well as the region's diaspora. It also seeks to facilitate the growth of Caribbean cinema by offering a wide-ranging industry programme and networking opportunities.

The Lusca Fantastic Film Fest (formerly Puerto Rico Horror Film Fest) was also founded in 2006 and is the first and only international fantastic film festival in the Caribbean devoted to sci-fi, thriller, fantasy, dark humor, bizarre, horror, anime, adventure, virtual reality, and animation in short and feature films.

European festivals 

The most important European film festivals are the Venice Film Festival (late summer to early autumn), the Cannes Film Festival (late spring to early summer), and the Berlin International Film Festival (late winter to early spring), founded in 1932, 1946, and 1951 respectively.

Animation 
Many film festivals are dedicated exclusively to animation.

 Annecy International Animated Film Festival (f. 1960—the oldest)
 Zagreb (f. 1972)
 Ottawa (f. 1976)
 Hiroshima (f. 1985)
 KROK (f. 1989)
 Anima Mundi (f. 1992)
 Fredrikstad Animation Festival (f. 1994)
 Animac (f. 1996)

A variety of regional festivals happen in various countries. Austin Film Festival is accredited by the Academy of Motion Picture Arts & Sciences, which makes all their jury award-winning narrative short and animated short films eligible for an Academy Award.

African festivals 

There are several significant film festivals held regularly in Africa. The biannual Panafrican Film and Television Festival of Ouagadougou (FESPACO) in Burkina Faso was established in 1969 and accepts competition-only films by African filmmakers and chiefly produced in Africa. The annual Durban International Film Festival in South Africa and Zanzibar International Film Festival in Tanzania has grown in importance for the film and entertainment industry, as they often screen the African premieres of many international films. The Nairobi Film Festival (NBO), which was established in 2016, with a special focus on screening exceptional films from around the world that are rarely presented in Nairobi’s mainstream cinema and spotlighting the best Kenyan films, has also been growing in popularity over the years and has improved the cinema-going culture in Kenya.

The Sahara International Film Festival, held annually in the Sahrawi refugee camps in western Algeria near the border of Western Sahara, is notable as the only film festival in the world to take place in a refugee camp. The festival has the two-fold aim of providing cultural entertainment and educational opportunities to refugees, and of raising awareness of the plight of the Sahrawi people, who have been exiled from their native Western Sahara for more than three decades.

Asian film festivals

India

The International Film Festival of India, organized by the government of India, was founded in 1952. The Chennai International Film Festival  has been organized since 2002 by the Indo Cine Appreciation Foundation (ICAF), Government of Tamil Nadu, the South Indian Film Chamber of Commerce and the Film Federation of India.

The Jaipur International Film Festival, founded in 2009, is the big and bedt international film festival in India. The International Film Festival of Kerala organised by the Government of Kerala held annually at Thiruvananthapuram is acknowledged as one of the leading cultural events in Indian.

The International Documentary and Short Film Festival of Kerala (IDSFFK), hosted by the Kerala State Chalachitra Academy, is a major documentary and short film festival.

The Mumbai Women's International Film Festival (MWIFF) is an annual film festival in Mumbai featuring films made by women directors and women technicians.

The Calcutta International Cult Film Festival (CICFF), is a popular international film festival based in Kolkata which showcases international cult films.

YathaKatha International Film & Literature Festival (YKIFLF) is an annual film & literature festival in Mumbai showcasing the collaboration of literature in cinema via various constructive discussions and forums. 1st edition of festival is being held from 25–28 November in Mumbai, Maharashtra India.

Others
Notable festivals include the Hong Kong International Film Festival (HKIFF), Busan International Film Festival (BIFF), Kathmandu International Mountain Film Festival, and the Melbourne International Film Festival (MIFF).

Arab World film festivals 

There are several major film festivals in the Arab world, such as the Beirut International Film Festival, Cairo International Film Festival, the only international competitive feature film festival recognized by the FIAPF in the Arab world and Africa, as well as the oldest in this category, Carthage Film Festival, the oldest festival in Africa and the Arab world, and Marrakech International Film Festival.

Festival administration

Business model 
Although there are notable for-profit festivals such as SXSW, most festivals operate on a nonprofit membership-based model, with a combination of ticket sales, membership fees, and corporate sponsorship constituting the majority of revenue. Unlike other arts nonprofits (performing arts, museums, etc.), film festivals typically receive few donations from the general public and are occasionally organized as nonprofit business associations instead of public charities. Film industry members often have significant curatorial input, and corporate sponsors are given opportunities to promote their brand to festival audiences in exchange for cash contributions. Private parties, often to raise investments for film projects, constitute significant "fringe" events. Larger festivals maintain year-round staffs often engaging in community and charitable projects outside the festival season.

Entry fee 
While entries from established filmmakers are usually considered pluses by the organizers, most festivals require new or relatively unknown filmmakers to pay an entry fee to have their works considered for screening. This is especially so in larger film festivals, such as the Jaipur International Film Festival in Jaipur India, Toronto International Film Festival, Sundance Film Festival, South by Southwest, Montreal World Film Festival, and even smaller "boutique" festivals such as the Miami International Film Festival, British Urban Film Festival in London and Mumbai Women's International Film Festival in India.

On the other hand, some festivals—usually those accepting fewer films, and perhaps not attracting as many "big names" in their audiences as do Sundance and Telluride—require no entry fee. Many smaller film festivals in the United States (the Stony Brook Film Festival on Long Island, the Northwest Filmmakers' Festival, and the Sicilian Film Festival in Miami), are examples.
 
The Portland International Film Festival charges an entry fee but waives it for filmmakers from the Northwestern United States, and some others with regional focuses have similar approaches.

Several film festival submission portal websites exist to streamline filmmakers' entries into multiple festivals. They provide databases of festival calls for entry and offer filmmakers a convenient "describe once, submit many" service.

Screening out of competition 
The core tradition of film festivals is competition, or judging which films are most deserving of various forms of recognition. Some festivals, such as the famous Cannes Film Festival, may screen films that are considered close to competition-quality without being included in the competition; the films are said to be screened "out of competition".

See also

 Arthouse film
 Cult film
 Foreign film
 List of film festivals
 List of film festivals in Africa
 List of film festivals in Asia
 List of film festivals in South America
 List of film festivals in Europe
 List of film festivals in North and Central America
 List of film festivals in Oceania
 List of short film festivals
 Online film festivals
 Outdoor cinema
 Outline of film
 Short film
 Atheist Film Festival

References

Further reading
Turan, Kenneth, Sundance to Sarajevo: Film Festivals and the World They Made, Los Angeles, University of California Press, 2002, hardback, .
 Watson, Nigel, "The Sense and Sensationalism of Film Festivals", Talking Pictures website
Top 3 Films Festival

Cultural festivals